is a Japanese tokusatsu miniseries, presented as a spin-off of Ultraman Z, directed and written by Kiyotaka Taguchi and Junichiro Ashiki respectively. The miniseries consist of 10 episodes, with the first to seventh episodes are available in Tsuburaya Imagination, Tsuburaya Productions' digital platform service as pay-per-view content.

Synopsis

Sevenger Fight focuses on the exploits of the SAA 1 Sevenger after being deployed by STORAGE members, with Haruki usually piloting it to confront daily monster attacks as Yoko, Yuka and Hebikura (Juggler) giving their commentary. The first and second episode took place prior to Ultraman Z's arrival, the third to fifth episodes are pertaining to incidents happen during the titular series and the sixth and seventh episodes set after Haruki and Ultraman Z's departure from Earth.

The Suflan Island Trilogy focuses on STORAGE trying to protect the Global Allied Forces facility stationed in the titular  for a freezing operation, defending the facility from incoming monster army attacks and eventually concludes with a guest appearance of Ultraman Leo.

Episodes

Production
The idea of a standalone Sevenger series was conceived by Taguchi as early as the filming of Ultraman Z episode 3 in Mt. Iwafune, focusing on Sevenger's fight against Guigass nearby the observatory. At some point of time later on, Taguchi brought up the idea when Tsuburaya started to launch their online subscription service and Shogakukan at the same time wanted more contents for the Ultraman Z Super Complete Works magazine. As both parties accepted the idea, production of the series took place in November 2020 at Mt. Iwafune. Although Sevenger Fight was done in the idea of parodying Ultra Fight and Redman, the production team wanted to make the miniseries faithfully accurate to the world view of Ultraman Z.

Whereas Sevenger is portrayed the same suit used in Ultraman Z, the rest of the appearing monsters were portrayed by attraction suits provided by Tsuburaya's Kaiju Warehouse.

In June 3, 2021, a pay-per-view virtual event was held for international audience for the worldwide broadcast of Sevenger Fight with English subtitles. The event includes Rima Matsuda, Takaya Aoyagi, Kiyotaka Taguchi and Sean Nichols of Ultraman Max as panelists. The first 500 purchasers of the online tickets include a free commemoration pin of the Ultraman series. On the same day also included Alien Barossa, one of the many appearing monsters/aliens in Ultraman Z, to interrupt the online event under the pretense of being envy towards Sevenger's popularity.

Voice cast
: 
: 
: 
/:

See also
Ultraman Z

References

External links
Sevenger Fight in Tsuburaya Station 

Ultra television series